Zheleznik may refer to:

 Zheleznik, Burgas Province, a village
 Zheleznik, Kardzhali Province, a village
 Zheleznik, Stara Zagora, a city neighbourhood

See also